Museum für angewandte Kunst may refer to:

 Museum für angewandte Kunst Frankfurt in Frankfurt
 Museum für Angewandte Kunst (Cologne) in Cologne
 Museum für Angewandte Kunst (Leipzig) in Leipzig
 Museum für angewandte Kunst Wien in Vienna

See also
 Museum of Applied Arts (disambiguation)